Lucien Troupel (11 January 1919-19 May 1993) was a French football player and manager. He played as a striker for Marseille, Brive, EF Marseille-Provence and Besançon. He coached Toulon, Cannes, Lyon, Marseille, Sedan, Bataillon Joinville, France (military team) and Châteauroux.

References

External links
Player profile
Manager profile

1919 births
1993 deaths
French footballers
Association football forwards
Olympique de Marseille players
Racing Besançon players
French football managers
SC Toulon managers
AS Cannes managers
Olympique Lyonnais managers
Olympique de Marseille managers
LB Châteauroux managers
ESA Brive players
Footballers from Paris